State Route 7 (SR 7) is a south–north state highway in Middle Tennessee, running from the Alabama state line in Lincoln County to SR 100/SR 46 in Hickman County.

Route description

Alabama state line to Columbia
SR 7 begins concurrent with Alabama State Route 53 at Lewter Chapel Drive on the Alabama-Tennessee state line in Lincoln County as a secondary highway. They then go west and intersect SR 110 before separating from (AL) SR 53, entering Giles Gounty and Ardmore, Tennessee, and continuing west to an interchange with I-65. At this interchange, SR 7 becomes the unsigned companion route of US 31. US 31/SR 7 then leave Ardmore and go north to Elkton and have a short concurrency with SR 273. They continue north through rural Giles County before having a junction with US 64 before entering Pulaski. SR 7 then becomes a primary highway and they come to an intersection with SR 11 and SR 15, becoming concurrent with SR 11. They go north through downtown and then come to the southern terminus of US 31A, with SR 11 separating and following it. US 31/SR 7 then leave Pulaski and goes north to the community of Waco, just west of Lynnville, and meets the western end of SR 129. The pair then crosses into Maury County and goes through Hopewell before entering Columbia.

Columbia to Bon Aqua
In Columbia, US 31/SR 7 intersect SR 50 before entering downtown and becoming concurrent with US 412 Bus/SR 99. They come to an intersection where SR 7 separates and turns northwest, becoming signed once again as a primary highway. SR 7 then goes northwest alone and intersects US 43/US 412/SR 6 before leaving Columbia. It then goes north to the community of Santa Fe and has an intersection and short concurrency with SR 247. It then continues northwest to the community of Fly and has an interchange with the Natchez Trace Parkway. SR 7 then crosses into Hickman County and passes through Primm Springs and ends at an intersection with SR 46 and SR 100 in Bon Aqua.

Major intersections

Truck route

SR 7 has one bannered route, State Route 7 Truck (SR 7 Truck) in Ardmore. The Truck Route begins, with secondary status, at SR 7 and Alabama State Route 53, on the Tennessee–Alabama line, on Austin Street heading north. At the intersection with Smith Avenue, SR 7 Truck curves west onto Austin Whitt Road. It then turns left onto Ardmore Ridge Road, where it picks up primary status, and passes by Ardmore City Park. The route ends at SR 7 on the Tennessee side north of the railroad underpass near the state line. The road exists primarily to allow tall trucks to bypass the low underpass.

See also 
List of state routes in Tennessee

References 

007
007
007
007